Guy Collins may refer to:

Guy N. Collins, American botanist
Guy Collins, producer of Raised By Zombies
Guy Collins, golfer, runner-up in 1973 Trans-Mississippi Amateur